The Chatham Marconi Maritime Center is a museum dedicated to the history of WCC, a short-wave radio station that operated for many years in Chatham, Massachusetts. The museum itself is located on the grounds of the Marconi-RCA Wireless Receiving Station.

External links

Museums in Barnstable County, Massachusetts
Chatham, Massachusetts
History museums in Massachusetts
Telecommunications museums in the United States